Margaret Heneghan (born 1959) is an Irish lawyer who was a judge of the Circuit Court between 2010 and 2015, before serving on the High Court from 2015 to 2017. She previously practiced as a barrister.

Early and personal life 
Heneghan was born in 1959. She attended the Gortnor Abbey school in County Mayo and was educated at the King's Inns. She is married to businessman Austin Power.

She was a founding member of the Mayo Association of Dublin.

Legal career 
She qualified as a barrister in 1993 and became a senior counsel in 2009. She acted in cases involving family law, personal injuries and repossessions. In 1997, she acted in repossession proceedings against Adele King.

She was appointed to the panel of the Commission for Communications Regulation in 2004. She served on the Legal Aid Board between 2009 and 2010.

Judicial career

Circuit Court 
Heneghan was appointed to the Circuit Court in January 2010. In April 2011, she was assigned to the Dublin circuit where she primarily presided over criminal trials. She also sat on three judge panels of the Special Criminal Court, including the trial of John Dundon for the murder of Shane Geoghegan.

In 2011, she presided over a defamation case taken by Michael Lowry against journalist Sam Smyth.

High Court 
She moved from the Circuit Court to the High Court in February 2015. She continued to hear criminal trials, including cases involving murder and sexual offences.

She retired early as judge, two years after being appointed to the High Court. Her final day as a judge was in October 2017.

References

Living people
High Court judges (Ireland)
Irish women judges
Alumni of King's Inns
21st-century Irish judges
21st-century women judges
1959 births
Circuit Court (Ireland) judges